The Little Gym International is a franchisor of infant and child oriented fitness gyms, following the guidelines set out by USA Gymnastics. It offers classes in gymnastics, dance, karate, and Kindermusic.  It was founded in 1976, by educator Robin Wes.

Today, The Little Gym International is headquartered in Scottsdale, Arizona. It was incorporated in 1992 to franchise The Little Gym concept. It currently operates over 300 franchises in 29 countries throughout the world.

References

External links
The Little Gym official website
The Little Gym Europe official website
The Little Gym Franchise reviews & information
The Little Gym India official website

Athletics clubs in the United States
Companies based in Scottsdale, Arizona
American companies established in 1976
Franchises
American cheerleading organizations
Dance education organizations
Gymnastics organizations
Gyms
1976 establishments in Arizona